The 1949 Brooklyn Dodgers held off the St. Louis Cardinals to win the National League title by one game. The Dodgers lost the World Series to the New York Yankees in five games.

Offseason 
 November 24, 1948: Tommy Lasorda was drafted by the Dodgers from the Philadelphia Phillies in the 1948 minor league draft.
 December 15, 1948: Pete Reiser was traded by the Dodgers to the Boston Braves for Mike McCormick and Nanny Fernandez.
 February 26, 1949: Hank Behrman was purchased from the Dodgers by the New York Giants.

Regular season 
Jackie Robinson led the NL in hitting and stolen bases and won the National League Most Valuable Player Award. Robinson was the first black player to win the NL MVP.

Season standings

Record vs. opponents

Opening Day lineup

Notable transactions 
 May 16, 1949: Bob Ramazzotti was traded by the Dodgers to the Chicago Cubs for Hank Schenz.
 May 18, 1949: Marv Rackley was traded by the Dodgers to the Pittsburgh Pirates for Johnny Hopp and cash (trade voided June 7).
 May 19, 1949: Nanny Fernandez was traded by the Dodgers to the Pittsburgh Pirates for Ed Bahr and Grady Wilson.
 September 28, 1949: Kermit Wahl was traded by the Dodgers to the Philadelphia Athletics for Bill McCahan and cash.
 September 30, 1949: Irv Noren was purchased from the Dodgers by the Washington Senators.

Roster

Player stats

Batting

Starters by position 
Note: Pos = Position; G = Games played; AB = At bats; H = Hits; Avg. = Batting average; HR = Home runs; RBI = Runs batted in

Other batters 
Note: G = Games played; AB = At bats; H = Hits; Avg. = Batting average; HR = Home runs; RBI = Runs batted in

Pitching

Starting pitchers 
Note: G = Games pitched; IP = Innings pitched; W = Wins; L = Losses; ERA = Earned run average; SO = Strikeouts

Other pitchers 
Note: G = Games pitched; IP = Innings pitched; W = Wins; L = Losses; ERA = Earned run average; SO = Strikeouts

Relief pitchers 
Note: G = Games pitched; W = Wins; L = Losses; SV = Saves; ERA = Earned run average; SO = Strikeouts

1949 World Series

Game 1 
October 5, 1949, at Yankee Stadium in New York City

Game 2 
October 6, 1949, at Yankee Stadium in New York City

Game 3 
October 7, 1949, at Ebbets Field in Brooklyn, New York

Game 4 
October 8, 1949, at Ebbets Field in Brooklyn, New York

Game 5 
October 9, 1949, at Ebbets Field in Brooklyn, New York

Awards and honors 
National League Most Valuable Player
Jackie Robinson
 National League Rookie of the Year
Don Newcombe

National League All-Stars 
1949 Major League Baseball All-Star Game
Jackie Robinson starter
Pee Wee Reese starter
Ralph Branca reserve
Roy Campanella reserve
Gil Hodges reserve
Don Newcombe reserve
Preacher Roe reserve

The Sporting News awards 
TSN Major League All-Star Team
Roy Campanella
Jackie Robinson
TSN NL Rookie of the Year Award
Don Newcombe

Farm system 

LEAGUE CHAMPIONS: Hollywood, Montreal, Pueblo, Geneva

Notes

References 
Baseball-Reference season page
Baseball Almanac season page

External links 
1949 Brooklyn Dodgers uniform
Brooklyn Dodgers reference site
Acme Dodgers page 
Retrosheet

 
Los Angeles Dodgers seasons
Brooklyn Dodgers season
National League champion seasons
Jackie Robinson
1949 in sports in New York City
1940s in Brooklyn
Flatbush, Brooklyn